Rasoul Taghian Chadegani (born 21 January 1987) is an Iranian weightlifter who won the gold medal in the Men's 77 kg weight class at the 2013 Asian Weightlifting Championships. His older brother Javad Taghian was his first coach.

Major results

References

External links 
 
 

Living people
1987 births
Iranian male weightlifters
Iranian strength athletes
Weightlifters at the 2014 Asian Games
Iranian sportspeople in doping cases
Universiade medalists in weightlifting
Universiade gold medalists for Iran
Asian Games competitors for Iran
Medalists at the 2013 Summer Universiade
21st-century Iranian people